Dieuches is a genus of dirt-colored seed bugs in the family Rhyparochromidae. There are more than 130 described species in Dieuches.

See also
 List of Dieuches species

References

External links

 

Rhyparochromidae